Brandi Sherwood is an American model, actress and beauty queen who won Miss USA and Miss Teen USA pageants. She was born in Idaho Falls, Idaho. She was originally 1st runner-up at Miss USA 1997, and later was crowned Miss USA when the original winner was crowned Miss Universe. And (at age 18) she was crowned Miss Teen USA 1989  and was a frequent rotating Barker's Beauty model on the US daytime television game show The Price Is Right from 2002 to 2009.

Pageant history

In 1997, she won the Miss Idaho USA title and represented her state at Miss USA 1997. She became first runner-up to eventual Miss USA, Brook Mahealani Lee.  Sherwood assumed the Miss USA title when Lee was crowned Miss Universe 1997 in Miami.  Sherwood held the titles of Miss Idaho Teen USA and Miss Idaho USA. To date, Sherwood is the only woman to have held the titles of both Miss Teen USA and  Miss USA.

During her reign as Miss USA, Sherwood worked with Special Olympics. She has also worked with the DARE program and continues to volunteer her time speaking to students about resisting drugs and violence.

Life after pageants
In 1996, Sherwood allegedly was invited on a modeling trip with six other women to Brunei by her friend, former Miss USA Shannon Marketic. Marketic later claimed in a lawsuit against the ruling family of Brunei that she was held against her will for 30 days. The lawsuit was thrown out because of the royal family's immunity as heads of state.

She also has acted in a few movies including Shark Zone, released in 2003.

Lawsuit against The Price Is Right
Sherwood was a model on the long running game show The Price Is Right. In 1999, she married movie actor Dean Cochran.  The Price Is Right host Drew Carey announced on the show's February 13, 2009 broadcast that Sherwood and Cochran were expecting twins in the summer, with a scheduled due date of June 12, 2009. Sherwood took time off for the rest of Season 37 and into Season 38, as episodes begin taping in late May to early June 2009. On February 23, 2010, the show declined her request to be booked again on the show.  She filed a lawsuit against FremantleMedia in 2010 and won a reported $775,000 in November 2012, later increased elevenfold to over $8.5 million to include punitive damages.

On March 12, 2013, Sherwood was stripped of her lawsuit winnings when the trial court ordered that the case be reheard due to a recent state Supreme Court decision.  Judge Kevin Brazile said that in February, two months after Sherwood declared victory, a state Supreme Court ruling affirmed the defense's argument that Brazile should have instructed the jury to determine whether pregnancy discrimination was a "substantial motivating factor" in the producers' decision. An undisclosed out of court settlement was reached in 2016.

Filmography

References

Notes
 Sherwood was originally 1st Runner-Up, but became Miss USA after the original titleholder, Brook Lee, won Miss Universe. Due to pageant protocol Miss USA must resign her title in the event she wins Miss Universe.

External links
 Official website as of January 12, 2021 on Wayback Machine
 

American female models
Game show models
People from Idaho Falls, Idaho
1971 births
Living people
Miss USA winners
Miss Teen USA winners
Miss USA 1997 delegates
20th-century American people
21st-century American women